The Woman without Money is a 1925 German silent film directed by Fritz Kaufmann and starring Grete Reinwald, Margarete Kupfer, and Rosa Valetti.

Cast

References

Bibliography

External links

1925 films
Films of the Weimar Republic
Films directed by Fritz Kaufmann
German silent feature films
German black-and-white films